The 1990 Wales rugby union tour of Namibia was a series of rugby union matches played between 23 May and 9 June 1990 in Namibia by the Wales national rugby union team. It was the first Welsh tour of Namibia and they won all six matches.

Results 
Scores and results list Wales's points tally first.

References

1990 rugby union tours
1990
1990
tour
1990 in African rugby union